Pernes-lès-Boulogne (literally Pernes near Boulogne) is a commune in the Pas-de-Calais department in the Hauts-de-France region of France.

Geography

Population

Places of interest
 The church of St. Esprit, dating from the nineteenth century.
 The three 16th century manorhouses of Senlecque, Godincthun and Huplandre.

See also
Communes of the Pas-de-Calais department

References

Perneslesboulogne